Rowshanabad (also Romanized as Rowshanābād; also known as Rowshanābād-e Bālā) is a village in Ganjafruz Rural District, in the Central District of Babol County, Mazandaran Province, Iran. At the 2006 census, its population was 3,773, in 989 families.

References 

Populated places in Babol County